Bradfield School is a secondary school with academy status situated on the edge of the village of Worrall, in the civil parish of Bradfield, in Sheffield, South Yorkshire, England. The school is a specialist Engineering College formerly catering for pupils between the ages of 11 and 18. However, as of September 2019, the school's sixth form has closed down and the school now only caters to between the ages of 11 and 16.

Curriculum 

At Key Stage 4 Bradfield provides students with a broad and balanced curriculum in line with the National Curriculum. All students take Citizenship (Half GCSE), English Language (One GCSE), English Literature (One GCSE), ICT (One GCSE), Mathematics (One GCSE), Physical Education (One GCSE), and Religious Education (Half GCSE) and Science Double Award (Two GCSEs).

Achievements

2006 
The Bradfield Panthers, an F1 In Schools team won the British national finals.

References 

Secondary schools in Sheffield
Academies in Sheffield
Educational institutions established in 1957
1957 establishments in England
Specialist engineering colleges in England